The 2018 Murray State Racers football team represented Murray State University in the 2018 NCAA Division I FCS football season. They were led by fourth-year head coach Mitch Stewart and played their home games at Roy Stewart Stadium. They were members of the Ohio Valley Conference. They finished the season 5–6, 5–3 in OVC play to finish in fourth place.

Previous season
The Racers finished the 2017 season 3–8, 2–5 in OVC play to finish in a tie for seventh place.

Preseason

OVC media poll
On July 20, 2018, the media covering the OVC released their preseason poll with the Racers predicted to finish in seventh place. On July 23, the OVC released their coaches poll with the Racers predicted to finish in eighth place.

Preseason All-OVC team
The Colonels had two players selected to the preseason all-OVC team.

Defense

Kenney Wooten – DL

Specialists

Gabriel Vicente – K

Schedule

Source: Schedule

Game summaries

Southern Illinois

at Central Arkansas

at Kentucky

UT Martin

at Eastern Illinois

Tennessee State

at Eastern Kentucky

Jacksonville State

at Tennessee Tech

Southeast Missouri State

at Austin Peay

Players drafted into the NFL

References

Murray State
Murray State Racers football seasons
Murray State Racers football